The Pouto Peninsula is a landform on the northern Kaipara Harbour in Northland, New Zealand. The Peninsula runs in the north west to south east direction and is approximately 55 km long. The width varies from about 5.4 km to about 14 km, with the widest part of the peninsula near its southern end. The Tasman Sea is to the west, and the Kaipara Harbour is to the south. The Wairoa River and Kaipara Harbour are to the east. Dargaville and State Highway 12 lie directly to the north east of the peninsula. The mouth of the Kaipara Harbour separates the peninsula from the smaller Te Korowai-o-Te-Tonga Peninsula to the south.

The most substantial settlement on the peninsula is Te Kōpuru. The locality of Pouto, originally a Māori village, is in the south east of the peninsula.

Geography and conservation

Much of Pouto – over 600 ha – is covered by sand dunes, which are one of the largest unmodified dune systems in New Zealand. Many of the dunes rise over 100 m above sea level, and the highest reaches 214 m. There are also both permanent and temporary wetlands, and more than 20 freshwater lakes and swamps. The interior is planted in exotic forests.

Several threatened plants, birds, invertebrates and a freshwater fish are found on the peninsula.

Shipwrecks
There have been 113 recorded shipwrecks on the coast of Pouto, because the low-lying peninsula makes the north head of the Kaipara Harbour treacherous, and there are a lack of landmarks on the peninsula from which to take bearings. Tradition recounts that Rongomai, the captain of the waka Māhuhu, drowned when his canoe capsized near the entrance to Kaipara Harbour in the early days of Māori settlement of New Zealand. The first shipwreck in recorded history was of the Aurora, a 550-ton barque, in 1840, and the most recent was the yacht Aosky in 1994.

New Zealand film maker Winston Cowie investigated potential Portuguese or Spanish shipwrecks on the Pouto Peninsula and recorded the oral tradition from interviews on the Iberian discovery question in his books Conquistador Puzzle Trail and Nueva Zelanda, un puzzle histórico: tras la pista de los conquistadores españoles. Cowie concludes that more research and investigation is required to conclude that any of them are Spanish or Portuguese. The oral tradition of Pouto elders, however, did mention a Spanish ship, helmets, armour in the sand, and buried treasure.

History
Descendants of the Māhuhu crew settled around Pouto and the South Head of Kaipara Harbour, possibly in the 13th century CE. Some of the crew of Aotea may have joined them in the 14th century. In the 15th century, Taramainuku, a grandson of the Arawa captain, settled at Pouto near the North Head, killing or driving away some of the previous occupants. According to tradition, the greater area of Kaipara is called after a hāngi Taramainuku hosted, at which the para fern (Marattia salicina) was served. ("Kai" is a Māori language word meaning "food".)

In the late 17th century, or early 18th, Ngāti Whātua occupied the Pouto Peninsula as part of their move southwards. In 1820, during the Musket Wars, Ngā Puhi laid siege to Ngāti Whātua's Tauhara pa near Pouto, but were unable to capture it. A truce was agreed, to be cemented by the marriage of a Ngā Puhi chief to the daughter of a Ngāti Whātua chief. During the festivities, Ngā Puhi and their allies suddenly turned on their hosts and massacred them.

In 1874, a customs house and pilot station were built at Pouto. A signal mast was erected in the sandhills at North Head in 1876, 5–6 miles west of the station. The following year, a telegraph system was set up between the two. A lighthouse was built at North Head in 1884. The customs office was shifted to Te Kōpuru in 1903. The lighthouse was automated in 1947, and closed in the mid-1950s. The structure still exists and was renovated in 1982–84.

Gum-diggers operated on the peninsula from the 1870s and lasting into the 1930s, although kauri trees no longer grew there. Dairy farming was established in the early 20th century. Sand from Pouto was used to build dams in the Waitākere Ranges, and was also barged around the Kaipara Harbour. The southern part of the peninsula was slow to be developed, with the road only reaching to Taingaehe in 1930, and extending another 35 km to Pouto itself in 1931. Until then, contact with the rest of the world was by steamer. The road wasn't metalled until the 1940s.

Education
Pouto School is a coeducational full primary (years 1–8) school with a roll of  students as of  A school was first established at Pouto in 1878.

There is also a primary school at Te Kōpuru. The leaflet 'Pouto – 105 years (1879–1984)' compiled in 1985 by local historian Logan Forrest to mark 104 years of education on the Pouto Peninsula – the history of the Pouto, Waikare, Punahaere and Rangitane schools – gives an overview of education and history on the peninsula up until 1984 – the centenary.

Demographics
Kaipara Coastal statistical area extends north past Aranga to the boundary with the Far North District.

Kaipara Coastal had a population of 3,690 at the 2018 New Zealand census, an increase of 261 people (7.6%) since the 2013 census, and an increase of 243 people (7.0%) since the 2006 census. There were 1,383 households, comprising 1,923 males and 1,764 females, giving a sex ratio of 1.09 males per female. The median age was 44.6 years (compared with 37.4 years nationally), with 726 people (19.7%) aged under 15 years, 594 (16.1%) aged 15 to 29, 1,695 (45.9%) aged 30 to 64, and 672 (18.2%) aged 65 or older.

Ethnicities were 79.2% European/Pākehā, 30.4% Māori, 3.1% Pacific peoples, 2.9% Asian, and 2.0% other ethnicities. People may identify with more than one ethnicity.

The percentage of people born overseas was 11.1, compared with 27.1% nationally.

Although some people chose not to answer the census's question about religious affiliation, 53.4% had no religion, 33.5% were Christian, 3.3% had Māori religious beliefs, 0.2% were Hindu, 0.2% were Muslim, 0.5% were Buddhist and 1.0% had other religions.

Of those at least 15 years old, 282 (9.5%) people had a bachelor's or higher degree, and 801 (27.0%) people had no formal qualifications. The median income was $24,600, compared with $31,800 nationally. 291 people (9.8%) earned over $70,000 compared to 17.2% nationally. The employment status of those at least 15 was that 1,338 (45.1%) people were employed full-time, 468 (15.8%) were part-time, and 90 (3.0%) were unemployed.

Notes

Kaipara District
Peninsulas of the Northland Region
Populated places around the Kaipara Harbour
Kaipara Harbour